At least two warships of the Soviet Navy have borne the name Admiral Nakhimov, in honour of Pavel Nakhimov an admiral of the Imperial Russian Navy.

 , a  launched in 1951.
 , a  launched in 1969.

See also
 

Soviet Navy ship names